is the 6th single by Japanese pop idol group Fairies, released on July 24, 2013. It is Fairies' first contribution to an anime series and is the opening and ending song for the Studio Comet and Sanrio/Sega Sammy Holdings anime series, Jewelpet Happiness.

Summary
"Hikari no Hate ni" is Fairies' first contribution to an anime series, first announced and performed during the anime's press conference in Sanrio Puroland. Ito Momoka, one of the members commented that "I'm honored to be able to perform at Sanrio Puroland where I've been visited many times." Regarding the theme song, she said, "Our song is bracing just like the anime, and the choreography to the song is cute which people can emulate!"

A short Dance PV of the song was later officially released on YouTube on April 5, 2013. On May 5, the single's release date was confirmed.

On June 6, 2013, a short preview of the full PV is shown on the official YouTube account along with two behind the scenes videos. According to the producers, the PV is shot in a big 3D projection stage.

Track listing

CD+DVD and CD Only Editions

Picture Label Edition (Mumo Shop / Vision Factory Official Shop Limited Edition) 
The picture label CD included in the edition comes in 7 different versions (each featuring a picture of a member). The version is chosen at random so the buyer doesn't know which member he is getting.

Charts

See also
 Jewelpet (anime)

References

External links

2013 singles
Anime songs
Jewelpet
2013 songs
Avex Trax singles
Songs written by Tetsurō Oda
Fairies (Japanese group) songs